John Mascal Evans  (17 May 1915 - 29 February 1996) was an Anglican priest, most notably Archdeacon of Surrey from 1968 to 1980.

Evans was educated at St John's School, Leatherhead; Brasenose College, Oxford; and Wells Theological College. As a curate in Epsom, in August 1940, he escorted children being evacuated to Canada as part of Children's Overseas Reception Board. He was then Vicar of Stoneleigh (1943-1952), Fleet (1952-1960) and Walton-on-Thames until his appointment as Archdeacon.

References

1996 deaths
1915 births
Alumni of Brasenose College, Oxford
Alumni of Wells Theological College
People educated at St John's School, Leatherhead
Archdeacons of Surrey